The Young Democrats for Europe (officially  Jeunes Démocrates Européens) is the youth wing of the European Democratic Party. The seat of the organisation is Brussels.

History

It was announced on 9 May 2007, the 50th Anniversary of the Treaty of Rome, and formally established at its first Conference on 22 September 2007 in Vilnius, Lithuania.  The founding members are the youth wings of the seven EDP founding parties:

  Youth of the Daisy - Democracy is Freedom – The Daisy (Italy)
  Young Democrats - Democratic Movement (France)
  Alternativa Giovanile - Popular Alliance (San Marino)
  Europaiko Komma (Cyprus)
   Jaunimo organizacija DARBAS (Lithuania)
  Cesta Změny (Czech Republic)
  Euzko Gaztedi (Basque Country)

Members

Full members

Observing members

Former members 

 Neolaia Europaikou Kommatos - NEK (founding member) 2007-2016

 Cesta Změny (founding member)

 UDI Jeunes (Union of Democrats and Independents (UDI)) - 2014-2016

 Jaunimo organizacija DARBAS (founding member) - 2007-2014

 Demokraticke Forum Mladeze (Democratic Slovakia Party) - 2011-2015

References

External links
Press release of Young Democrats for Europe on the day of Europe
Birth of the first young European democratic voice

Democrats for Europe, Young